Gholamreza Nouri Ghezeljeh (born 1970) is an Iranian politician. Nouri Ghezeljeh was born in Ghezeljeh, Bostanabad, East Azerbaijan. He is a member of the 9th and 11th Islamic Consultative Assembly from the electorate of Bostanabad. Nouri Ghezeljeh won with 17,204 (30.39%) and 17126 ( 37% ) votes.He is currently the head of the reformist fraction in the Islamic Consultative Assembly of Iran news.

References

1970 births
Living people
Deputies of Bostanabad
Followers of Wilayat fraction members
People from East Azerbaijan Province
Members of the 9th Islamic Consultative Assembly
Members of the 11th Islamic Consultative Assembly
Executives of Construction Party politicians